Timothy's Quest is a 1936 American comedy film directed by Charles Barton and written by Virginia Van Upp, Dore Schary and Gilbert Pratt, based on a novel by Kate Douglas Wiggin.

The film stars Eleanore Whitney, Tom Keene, Dickie Moore, Virginia Weidler, Elizabeth Patterson, Sally Martin and Benny Bartlett. The film was released on January 31, 1936, by Paramount Pictures.

Plot

Timothy and his sister run away from an orphanage because of the poor treatment they experienced there. They end up together on a farm, where the owner puts Timothy through a series of arduous chores to earn his keep.

Cast

References

External links 
 

1936 films
1930s English-language films
American comedy films
1936 comedy films
Paramount Pictures films
Films directed by Charles Barton
American black-and-white films
Films based on works by Kate Douglas Wiggin
1930s American films